Mikhail Pavlovich Malakhov (1781, Chernigov Governorate, Russian Empire, now Ukraine – 1842, Yekaterinburg, Russian Empire, now Russia ) was a Russian architect who graduated from the Imperial Academy of Arts in 1802 and was active primarily in Yekaterinburg. He was responsible for many Neoclassical buildings in the Urals, including private residences (such as Kharitonov Palace and Kyshtym Manor House) and churches (Alexander Nevsky Cathedral in Yekaterinburg, Trinity Cathedral in Kamensk-Uralsky).

References

Russian neoclassical architects
1781 births
1842 deaths